Rubin Andre Carter (born May 12, 1979) is an American football coach recently for Louisiana State University and former player in the National Football League (NFL). A defensive end, he played college football for the University of California, and was a unanimous All-American.  The San Francisco 49ers selected him with the seventh overall pick in the 2001 NFL Draft, and he also played for the Washington Redskins, New England Patriots and Oakland Raiders.

Early years
Carter was born in Denver, Colorado.  He attended Oak Grove High School in San Jose, California.  As a senior, he was a USA Today All-America high school selection, and the Gatorade California Player of the Year.  He was also rated as the top defensive lineman and a high school All-America selection by Parade magazine.

College career
Carter attended the University of California, Berkeley, and played for the California Golden Bears football team from 1997 to 2000. During his junior and senior years he was a first-team All-Pac-10 selection.  As a senior in 2000, he won the Morris Trophy, awarded to the Pac-10's top defensive lineman, and was recognized as a unanimous first-team All-American.  In addition to being selected as the Golden Bears' most valuable player, Carter was also a finalist for the Bronko Nagurski Trophy, given to the nation's top defensive player.

Professional career

San Francisco 49ers
Carter was selected by the San Francisco 49ers in the first round of the 2001 NFL Draft. Because the 49ers used a 3-4 defense under Head Coach Mike Nolan, Carter was moved to outside linebacker. While playing for the 49ers, he made 154 solo tackles, 32 sacks, and 12 pass deflections in 69 games.

Washington Redskins

Carter signed a six-year, $30 million contract with the Washington Redskins as an unrestricted free agent on March 14, 2006. The Redskins moved Carter back to defensive end, his natural position. In his first year with the Redskins, he had 56 total tackles and six sacks.  He showed much improvement in 2007, with 55 tackles, 10.5 sacks, and four forced fumbles. He also had a safety in a 34-3 win over the Detroit Lions. Carter's best season as a Redskin came in 2009 when he totalled 11 sacks. However, in 2010 the Redskins hired a new coach, Mike Shanahan, who changed their 4-3 defense to a 3-4 defense which required Carter to play outside linebacker. Carter was never fully comfortable with the move. By mid-season, and at Carter's request, the coaching staff had him playing from a three-point stance on passing downs. The Redskins released Carter on March 1, 2011.

New England Patriots
Carter announced on his Twitter page on August 7 that he will be playing for the New England Patriots in 2011. It was later confirmed by Ian Rapoport of the Boston Herald and Michael Lombardi of the NFL Network. According to Rapoport, Carter signed a one-year deal with a base salary of $1.75m.  He also received a $500k signing bonus and the chance to earn another $500k in incentives, making the contract worth up to $2.75 million. On November 13, 2011, Carter had a career game against the New York Jets, recording 4 sacks and tying the Patriots single game sack record. On Sunday, December 18, 2011 while playing against the Denver Broncos, Carter tore his left quadriceps tendon and missed the remainder of the 2011 regular season as well as the playoffs, as he underwent surgery. Despite being injured, Carter was one of eight Patriots honored by a selection to the 2012 Pro Bowl.

Patriots franchise record
 Most sacks in a single game: 4 (2011) (vs New York Jets) (tied)

Oakland Raiders
On September 26, 2012, the Oakland Raiders announced they had signed Carter. On April 9, 2013 Carter re-signed with the Raiders on a one-year deal. On August 31, 2013, he was released.

New England Patriots
Carter re-signed with the Patriots on October 22, 2013 to add a veteran presence to a Patriots defense that lost Vince Wilfork and Jerod Mayo to season-ending injuries earlier in the season.

Career statistics

Coaching career
In August 2015, Carter returned to California as an undergraduate assistant. On February 10, 2017 Carter was hired by the Miami Dolphins as an assistant defensive line coach.
When Adam Gase was fired by Miami and subsequently hired by the New York Jets, Carter moved with Gase to New York and became the Jets Defensive Line coach.

In 2021 Carter became the defensive Line Coach at Louisiana State University (LSU).

Personal life
Carter is the son of former Denver Broncos defensive tackle Rubin Carter. He has a wife, Bethany, and two children: stepdaughter, Aysha, born in 1993, and a son, Quincy, born in 2007.  His middle name was given to him by his father who named him after his close friend and teammate  Andre Townsend.

References

External links

 Oakland Raiders bio
 New England Patriots bio
 California Golden Bears bio
 New York Jets bio

1979 births
Living people
African-American coaches of American football
African-American players of American football
All-American college football players
American Conference Pro Bowl players
American football defensive ends
American football linebackers
California Golden Bears football players
Miami Dolphins coaches
New England Patriots players
New York Jets coaches
Oakland Raiders players
People from Denver
Players of American football from San Jose, California
San Francisco 49ers players
Washington Redskins players
21st-century African-American sportspeople
20th-century African-American sportspeople